Sven Lennart Green (born 25 December 1941) is a Swedish world champion close-up/card magician, a title which he won in 1991 at the FISM convention in Lausanne, Switzerland. He is known for his seemingly chaotic routines which, in spite of first appearances, display great skill. His original techniques and presentation style form an unorthodox and innovative contribution to sleight of hand magic.

Biography 
Green began practicing magic at the age of 18. Green competed at the 1988 FISM convention in The Hague, Netherlands, and was erroneously disqualified because the judges believed he had used stooges in his act to shuffle the cards. In 1991, he performed the same act but insisted that the judges themselves shuffle the cards to prove that he used no stooges. The judges then awarded him first place.

Green has appeared on the fourth World's Greatest Magic television special. He lives in Gothenburg, Sweden, and lectures internationally.

He appeared at TED in February 2005, where he performed his signature card routine.

Privately, Green has worked 7 years as a doctor in Sweden.
In 2014 Green suffered a stroke that prevented him from performing lectures in the following months, but has since fully recovered.

In late 2022, Swedish cardist Noel Heath released a deck of cards in collaboration with Lennart Green, Heath Backs Lennart Green ed. through his company Heath Cards.

Works 
 Green Magic – Classic Green, Volumes 1–6, DVD
 Green Magic – Green Lite, Volume 7, DVD
 Masterfile, Volumes 1–4, DVD
 The Stolen Cards, DVD
 The Figurine, DVD

Notes

Sources 
 Tibbs, Geoff, "Lennart Green and the Modern Drama of Sleight of Hand", Journal of Performance Magic, 1(1), October 2013.

External links 
 

1941 births
Swedish magicians
Card magic
Sleight of hand
People from Västervik Municipality
Living people
Academy of Magical Arts Close-Up Magician of the Year winners
Academy of Magical Arts Creative Fellowship winners